The World Kickboxing Network (WKN) is an international Kickboxing governing body established in 1994.

History
In 1994, the World Kickboxing Network was founded as a subsidiary of International Sport Karate Association (ISKA) to capture new markets. The  ISKA's operations were concentrated in the North American market, while WKN was focusing in Europe. In the 1990s there was strong competition between kickboxing federations. Both organizations split in late 1998 due to minor disagreements. The newly created team was chaired by Frenchman Stephane Cabrerra, Billy Murray and Olivier Muller.

On September 19, 1998, WKN became the first organization to promote a world championship in Muay Thai on the same event as a boxing world championship. Jérôme Le Banner vs. Espedito Da Silva for the WKN World super heavyweight Muay Thai title was sanctioned on the undercard of Evander Holyfield vs. Vaughn Bean for the WBA and IBF heavyweight titles at Georgia Dome in Atlanta. The event was organized in collaboration with promoter Don King whom raised the hand of Le Banner, crowned new WKN Muay Thai world champion after knocking out Da Silva in the first-round.

On October 22, 2004, WKN made history in kickboxing by promoting the first kickboxing world championship bout in Romania. Samir Mohamed vs. Alexander Kozachenko for the WKN World super lightweight title headlined the Eurosport and Pro TV televised event Local Kombat 10 in the city of Brăila. The local Kombat promotion later developed into the Superkombat Fighting Championship, with its winners competing for the WKN titles.

In January 2011, International Vale Tudo Championship (IVC) announced its return with a new ruleset based on the Unified Rules of Mixed Martial Arts. On August 20, 2016, WKN brought IVC back to the international scene by co-promoting Micheletti Vs. Ortiz for the WKN World super cruiserweight World title in the main event of IVC 15 in Sao Paulo, Brazil. The event also included MMA bouts. Micheletti defeated Ortiz and took the title by knockout in the first round. After IVC 15, there were no more events and the organization is currently on hiatus. After IVC 15 there were no more events and the organization is currently on hiatus.

In 2014, WKN launched a world series of international kickboxing events named Simply the Best which was broadcast on FOX Sports and SFR Sport 5.

WKN World Cup 

 WKN World Cup 2009 Paceville, St. Julian's, Malta 

The event took place in St. Julian's, Malta on September 19, 2009 with up to 13 countries partaking, including Malta, Corsica, Belgium, Egypt, France, Poland, UK, among others.

 WKN World Cup 2019 Auckland, New Zealand 

The event was held from November 28 to November 30, 2019, as an amateur championship contested by international athletes in their respective weight classes. It took place at The Trusts Arena in Auckland, New Zealand with up to 60 countries participating. The event marked the first time kickboxing and mixed martial arts world championships were contested at the same event in New Zealand. The WKN World Middleweight MMA title bout between Kelvin Joseph and Roan Carneiro as well as the WKN World Super Heavyweight championship bout between the champion Gregory Tony and former UFC Heavyweight title challenger and former Cage Rage World Heavyweight champion Antonio "Bigfoot" Silva were expected to headline the last day of competition.

The fight between Tony and Silva was cancelled, as Silva was not medically cleared after being knocked out in his previous bout. Carneiro won the fight against Joseph and took the title by submission in the first round.

 WKN World Cup 2017 Tehran, Iran 

The event was held in Tehran, Iran on March 10, 2017 with 12 countries participating.

WKN Champions 

 Tyrone Spong
 Jerome Le Banner
 Batu Khasikov
 Nathan Corbett
 John Wayne Parr
 Artem Levin
 Corentin Jallon
 Riyadh Al-Azzawi
 Vladimir Mineev
 Andrei Kulebin
 Yohan Lidon
 Xhavit Bajrami
 Dmitry Shakuta
 Alexander Ustinov
 Daniel Ghiță
 Cătălin Moroșanu
 Ionuț Atodiresei
 Amancio Paraschiv
 Ionuț Iftimoaie
 Nicolas Wamba
 Siniša Kovačić
 Ekaterina Vandaryeva
 Ondřej Hutník
 Youssef Boughanem
 Brandon Vieira
 Federico Roma
 Gary Hamilton
 Jacko Ali

Champions by weight class 
WKN uses the following weight divisions.

See also
 Kickboxing
 List of kickboxing organizations
 World Association of Kickboxing Organizations
 World Kickboxing Association

Sources
Books and articles
  "A History of Full Contact Karate
 "A History of Kickboxing" – Mikes Miles
  Delmas Alain, Callière Jean-Roger, Histoire du Kick-boxing, FKBDA, France, 1998
  Delmas Alain, Définition du Kick-boxing, FKBDA, France, 1999
 Miles Mikes, site An interview with Joe Lewis, 1998

References

External links

Kickboxing organizations
Sports organizations established in 1994